Marco Vicario (20 September 1925 – 10 September 2020) was an Italian film actor, screenwriter, film producer and director. He appeared in 23 films between 1950 and 1958. He also wrote for 13 films, produced 12 and directed a further 11. He was born in Rome, Italy in September 1925. Vicario died in September 2020 at the age of 94.

Selected filmography
 Wifemistress (1977 - wrote and directed)
 The Sensual Man (1974 - wrote and directed)
 Man of the Year (1971 - wrote and directed)
 The Swinging Confessors (1970 - wrote and directed)
 Machine Gun McCain (1969 - produced)
 Seven Times Seven (1968 - produced)
 Seven Golden Men (1965 - directed)
 The Naked Hours (1964 - wrote, directed, and produced)
 Danza macabra (1964 - produced)
 Songs of Italy (1955 - acted)
 Rome 11:00 (1952 - acted)
 The Eternal Chain (1952 - acted)
 Redemption (1952 - acted)
 Appointment for Murder (1951 - acted)
 Operation Mitra (1951 - acted)
 Cavalcade of Heroes (1950 - acted)

References

External links
 
 

1925 births
2020 deaths
Male actors from Rome
Italian male film actors
Italian screenwriters
Italian male screenwriters
Italian film producers
Italian film directors
Nastro d'Argento winners